Eric Otogo-Castane (born April 13, 1976) is a Gabonese association football referee.

He was one of the referees for the Africa Cup of Nations in 2013, 2015, 2017, and 2019.

External links

Gabonese football referees
Living people
1976 births
Place of birth missing (living people)
21st-century Gabonese people